The Königsallee (literally "King's Avenue") is an urban boulevard in Düsseldorf, state capital of North Rhine-Westphalia, Germany. The Königsallee is noted for both the landscaped canal that runs along its center, as well as for the fashion showrooms and luxury retail stores located along its sides.

Nicknamed Kö by locals, the Königsallee is one of Germany's busiest upscale shopping streets.

Location 

The Königsallee is some 1 km long and lies in the district of Stadtmitte. It stretches from Hofgarten, Düsseldorf's main park, to Carl-Theodor-Straße and Luisenstraße on its Southern end. At Hofgarten, the Königsallee reaches onto Landskrone, a peninsula of the park's lake. Adjacent to Königsallee are the Altstadt, Düsseldorf's old quarter, and Schadowstraße, Germany's shopping street with the highest sales revenues.

The canal is some 31 m wide and fed by water from the Düssel, from which the city got its name. The Eastern side of Königsallee is entirely commercial, with numerous upmarket flagship stores and block-internal shopping arcades leading to and from the boulevard. Most of the Western side is quieter, given that it predominantly has offices, bank branches and hotels. Cafés and restaurants are located on both sides.

History 

By the end of the 18th century, Düsseldorf was a small Baroque town and capital of the Grand Duchy of Berg. Following the Treaty of Lunéville, the Duke was to have Düsseldorf's fortifications removed, which turned out to give room for a more generous urban plan. This plan included a Classicism esplanade, designed by architect to the court Caspar Anton Huschberger, in co-operation with landscape architect Maximilian Friedrich Weyhe and hydraulic engineer Wilhelm Gottlieb Bauer.

The canal and boulevard were completed between 1802 and 1804. Hotel Breidenbacher Hof was opened in 1812; other buildings followed shortly after. The canal is fed by the Düssel, which was diverted to provide the necessary water. Two iron bridges cross the canal. On the suggestion of the landscape architect, Chestnut trees were planted along the canal and the boulevard was therefore given the name "Kastanienallee" accordingly. After an incident in 1848, when horse manure was thrown at King Friedrich Wilhelm IV, the street was renamed "Königsallee" (meaning King's Avenue) as a gesture of reconciliation.

Düsseldorf lost its independence to Prussia for most of the 19th and early 20th century,  but the city remained an important international centre of the arts, and Königsallee its foremost boulevard. After 1946, with Düsseldorf's new weight as state capital of the economically most powerful state of Germany, and the city's location at the heart of the largest metropolitan region in Germany, caused the German fashion industry to consolidate Düsseldorf as one of the world’s fashion capitals. An open-air fashion show on Königsallee initiated the first Igedo Fashion Fair in 1949, which over the years grew to become one of the world's largest fashion fairs. Since 1981 the biannual Düsseldorf Fashion Shows are held as Collection Premiers Düsseldorf (cpd) - primarily at Messe Düsseldorf Exhibition Centre, but showrooms throughout the city.

The Northeastern section has recently been redeveloped with a 40,000 m² office and retail complex called "Kö-Bogen", designed by architect Daniel Libeskind. The first sections were opened in 2014.

Assortment 
Many major designers have a presence on Königsallee, so that a roll call reads like a "who's who" of the international fashion industry. Products offered range from luxury fur coats to high-end electronics for audiophiles, and the gamut in between. The following list is an overview of some of the most notable stores. An extended scope and range of shops, brands and services goes on other nearby streets.

Stores

Hotels 
 Breidenbacher Hof
 InterContinental
 Steigenberger Parkhotel

In popular culture

The Königsallee is referred to in Herbert Grönemeyer's 1984 hit Bochum. The singer compares it to the Königsallee in Bochum (an unimpressive thoroughfare) and infers that “big money” counts in Düsseldorf, but “the heart” in Bochum.

Places of interest nearby 

 Düsseldorfer Schauspielhaus, theater
 Deutsche Oper am Rhein, opera house
 Kunstsammlung Nordrhein-Westfalen  K20 and K21
 stilwerk Düsseldorf

See also
 
 District 1, Düsseldorf
 NRW Forum
 List of leading shopping streets and districts by city
 List of canals in Germany

References

External links

Many photos on bilderbuch-duesseldorf.de 
Königsallee interest group 
Igedo Company 
düsseldorf fashion house 

Streets in Düsseldorf
Boulevards
Shopping districts and streets in Germany
Canals in Germany
Gardens in North Rhine-Westphalia
Landmarks in Germany
German fashion
Tourist attractions in Düsseldorf
Canals opened in 1804